Supersonic Electronics is an American brand that specializes in consumer electronics that are primarily sold at pharmacies, big-box stores, and online retailers.

History
Supersonic Electronics was founded in 1979 as a manufacturer of consumer audio and video electronics. Today, Supersonic manufactures portable & LCD televisions, portable & compact DVD players, MP3/MP4 video players, MP3 docking stations & speakers, digital camcorders-still cameras, digital photo frames, portable audio systems and mobile accessories.

In 2012, Supersonic entered the Tablet PC market with the SC-77TV model tablet that runs on Android 4.2.

References

External links
 Official website

History of radio
American companies established in 1979
Electronics companies established in 1979
Electronics companies of the United States
Consumer electronics brands
Companies based in California